Gandulf or Gandolf (Latin Gandolphus, French Gandolphe, Italian Gandolfo) is a masculine given name of Germanic origin, common in the Middle Ages. The roots of the name are gand (literally "wand" or "magic wand", by extension "sorcery") and wolf ("wolf").

Gandulf of Piacenza (10th century), Italian count
Gandulf (11th century), bishop of Reggio nell'Emilia
Gandulf (died 1184), bishop of Alba
Gandulf of Bologna (died after 1185), theologian
Gandulf (died 1229), abbot of Saint-Sixte and cardinal
Gandulf of Binasco (died 1260), Franciscan saint
Gandolphus Siculus (floruit 1438–44), Sicilian papal legate to India

See also
Gandalf (disambiguation)
Gandolfi
Gundulf
Castel Gandolfo

Notes

Masculine given names
Germanic masculine given names